Joseph Auguste (born 21 September 1955) is a former Trinidadian footballer who played as a forward in the Football League for Exeter City.

Career
Auguste began his career in the youth set-up at Blackpool, before joining Chelmsford City. Auguste failed to settle at Chelmsford and dropped out of senior football for three years, before joining Hounslow. In 1979, Auguste joined Hayes, where he played 55 times, scoring five times, over the course of two years. Auguste re-joined Hounslow in 1981, following his departure from Hayes. In September 1983, Auguste joined Football League club Exeter City on non-contract terms. Auguste made his debut for the club in a 2–0 loss against Bristol Rovers on 17 September 1983, going on to make 10 league appearances for the club. In November 1983, Auguste left Exeter, re-joining Hounslow in the process.

References

1955 births
Living people
Sportspeople from Port of Spain
Association football forwards
Trinidad and Tobago footballers
Trinidad and Tobago expatriate footballers
Trinidad and Tobago expatriate sportspeople in England
Expatriate footballers in England
Chelmsford City F.C. players
Hounslow F.C. players
Hayes F.C. players
Exeter City F.C. players
English Football League players